PUFS may refer to:

University 
Pusan University of Foreign Studies, in Busan, South Korea
Pyongyang University of Foreign Studies, in Pyongyang, North Korea

Other 
Peer Union File System
Physical Unclonable Functions
Pinups for Soldiers, Georgia, United States